Spiraculum is a genus of operculate land snails in the subfamily Cyclophorinae of the family Cyclophoridae, native to parts of Asia.

Species

Synonyms
 Spiraculum gordoni (Benson, 1863): synonym of Cyclotus gordoni (Benson, 1863) (unaccepted combination)
 Spiraculum grohi Thach & F. Huber, 2018: synonym of Cyclotus grohi (Thach & F. Huber, 2018) (original combination)
 Spiraculum harryleei Thach & F. Huber, 2018: synonym of Cyclotus harryleei (Thach & F. Huber, 2018) (original combination)
 Spiraculum thachi (F. Huber, 2017): synonym of Spiraculum huberi (Thach, 2016) (junior synonym)
 Spiraculum (Pseudospiraculum) Kobelt, 1902 represented as Spiraculum Pearson, 1833
 Spiraculum (Spiraculum) Pearson, 1833 represented as Spiraculum Pearson, 1833
Taxon inquirednum
 Spiraculum franzhuberi (Thach, 2017)

References

External links
 Pearson J.T. (1833). Note on the genus Spiraculum. Journal of the Asiatic Society of Bengal. 2: 590-592
 Kobelt W. (1902). Das Tierreich. Eine Zusammenstellung und Kennzeichnung der rezenten Tierformen. 16. Lieferung. Mollusca. Cyclophoridae. Das Tierreich. XXXIX + 662 pp., 1 map.

Cyclophoridae
Gastropod genera